Dare Not Linger: The Presidential Years is a book by Nelson Mandela and Mandla Langa describing Mandela's term as President of South Africa. It was published in 2017, four years after Mandela's death, and is based on an unfinished memoir that Mandela had worked on after his term as president, as well as archive material and interviews, and has a prologue by Graça Machel. The book's title comes from the closing sentence of Mandela's previous autobiography Long Walk to Freedom: "But I can only rest for a moment, for with freedom comes responsibilities, and I dare not linger, for my long walk is not ended."

References

2017 non-fiction books
Books published posthumously
Biographies of Nelson Mandela
Works by Nelson Mandela
Pan Books books